Hugues Miorin (born Fumel, 30 November 1968) is a former French rugby union player. He played as a lock.

He played for Stade Toulousain. He won to win six titles of French Champion, for 1994, 1995, 1996, 1997, 1999 and 2001 and the first European Cup in 1996. He earned his first cap with the French national team on 20 April 1996 against Romania.

Honours 
 French rugby champion, 1994, 1995, 1996, 1997, 1999 and 2001
 Challenge Yves du Manoir 1993, 1995 and 1998
 Heineken Cup 1996

External links 
 ESPN profile
 ERC stats

Living people
French rugby union players
France international rugby union players
Stade Toulousain players
1968 births
Rugby union locks